The following lists events that happened during 2014 in the United Arab Emirates.

Incumbents
President: Khalifa bin Zayed Al Nahyan 
Prime Minister: Mohammed bin Rashid Al Maktoum

Events

January
 January 19 - Sheikh Mohammed Bin Rashid Al Maktoum, Prime Minister and Vice President of the United Arab Emirates announces mandatory military service for males aged 18-30.

July
 July 2 - Former British Prime Minister Tony Blair agrees to become Egyptian President Abdel Fattah el-Sisi's economic adviser as part of a program funded by the United Arab Emirates.

August
 August 25 - Twice in the last seven days, Egypt and the United Arab Emirates have secretly teamed up to launch airstrikes against Islamist-allied militants in Libya battling for control of Tripoli according to senior American officials.

References

 
Years of the 21st century in the United Arab Emirates
United Arab Emirates
United Arab Emirates
2010s in the United Arab Emirates